The Drosophila connectome, once completed, will be a complete list of the roughly 135,000 neurons in the brain of the fruit fly Drosophila melanogaster, along with all of the connections (synapses) between these neurons.  As of 2020, the Drosophila connectome is a work in progress, being obtained by the methods of neural circuit reconstruction.  A stack of EM images of an entire brain exist, suitable for sparse tracing of specific circuits.  A full connectome of a large portion of the central brain is likewise available.  Many of the 76 compartments of the Drosophila brain have connectomes available, and the remainders are subjects of ongoing study.

Why Drosophila
Connectome research (connectomics) has a number of competing objectives. On the one hand, investigators prefer an organism small enough that the connectome can be obtained in a reasonable amount of time. This argues for a small creature. On the other hand, one of the main uses of a connectome is to relate structure and behavior, so an animal with a large behavioral repertoire is desirable. It's also very helpful to use an animal with a large existing community of experimentalists, and many available genetic tools. Drosophila looks very good on these counts:
The brain contains about 135,000 neurons, small enough to be reconstructed in the near future. 
The fruit fly exhibits many complex behaviors. Hundreds of different behaviors (feeding, grooming, flying, mating, learning, and so on) have been qualitatively and quantitatively studied over the years.
The genetics of the fruit fly are well understood, and many (tens of thousands) of genetic variants are available.
There are many electrophysiological, calcium imaging, and other studies ongoing with Drosophila.

Structure of the fly connectome

Adult brain 
A high-level connectome, at the level of brain compartments and interconnecting tracts of neurons, exists for the full fly brain. A version of this is available online.

Detailed circuit-level connectomes exist for the lamina and a medulla column, both in the visual system of the fruit fly, and the alpha lobe of the mushroom body.

In May of 2017 a paper published in bioRxiv presented an electron microscopy image stack of the whole adult female brain at synaptic resolution. The volume is available for sparse tracing of selected circuits.

In 2020, a dense connectome of half the central brain of Drosophila was released, along with a web site that allows queries and exploration of this data. The methods used in reconstruction and initial analysis of the connectome followed.

Adult ventral nerve cord 
In 2022, a group of scientists mapped the motor control circuits of the ventral nerve cord using electron microscopy.

Larval brain 
In 2023 Michael Winding et al. published a complete larval brain connectome. This connectome was mapped by annotating the previously collected electron microscopy volume. They found that the larval brain was composed of 3,016 neurons and 548,000 synapses. 93% of brain neurons had a homolog in the opposite hemisphere. Of the synapses, 66.6% were axo-dendritic, 25.8% were axo-axonic, 5.8% were dendro-dendritic, and 1.8% were dendro-axonic. 

To study the connectome, they treated it as a directed graph with the neurons forming nodes and the synapses forming the edges. Using this representation, Winding et al found that the larval brain neurons could be clustered into 93 different types, based on connectivity alone. These types aligned with the known neural groups including sensory neurons (visual, olfactory, gustatory, thermal, etc), descending neurons, and ascending neurons. 

The authors ordered these neuron types based on proximity to brain inputs vs brain outputs. Using this ordering, they could quantify the proportion of recurrent connections, as the set of connections going from neurons closer to outputs towards inputs. They found that 41% of all brain neurons formed a recurrent connection. The neuron types with the most recurrent connections were the dopaminergic neurons (57%),  mushroom body feedback neurons (51%), mushroom body output neurons (45%), and convergence neurons (42%) (receiving input from mushroom body and lateral horn regions). These neurons, implicated in learning, memory, and action-selection, form a set of recurrent loops.

Structure and behavior
A natural question is whether the connectome will allow simulation of the fly's behavior.  However, the connectome alone is not sufficient.   Additional information needed includes gap junction varieties and locations, identities of neurotransmitters,  receptor types and locations, neuromodulators and hormones (with sources and receptors), the role of glial cells,  time evolution rules for synapses, and more.

The fruit fly connectome has been used to identify an area of the fruit fly brain that is involved in odor detection and tracking. Fles choose a direction in turbulent conditions by combining information about the direction of air flow and the movement of odor packets. Based on the fly connectome, processing must occur in the “fan-shaped body” where wind-sensing neurons and olfactory direction-sensing neurons cross.

See also 
Virtual Fly Brain
Pigment dispersing factor
Ganglion mother cell
OpenWorm

References

Further reading

External links 
FlyCircuit Database
Fruit Fly Brain Observatory

Brain
Emerging technologies
Neural coding
Neuroimaging
Neuroinformatics
Drosophila melanogaster
Invertebrate nervous system